The Thumb is a peak of the Mount Bowen massif on Hinchinbrook Island, off the north east coast of Queensland, Australia. It rises  out of the Coral Sea. The first ascent by Europeans was in 1953 by Jon Stephenson, John Comino, Geoff Broadbent, Dave Stewart, and Ian McLeod from the University of Queensland's Bushwalking Club (UQBWC).

See also

 List of mountains of Australia

References

Mountains of Queensland